Prosper Kasim (born 15 December 1996), often written as Kasim Prosper, is a Ghanaian professional footballer who plays as a forward for USL Championship club Birmingham Legion.

Career statistics

References

External links
 Elite Prospects profile
 IFK Göteborg profile

1996 births
Living people
Ghanaian footballers
Ghana under-20 international footballers
Association football midfielders
IFK Göteborg players
Norrby IF players
Mjällby AIF players
Birmingham Legion FC players
Allsvenskan players
Superettan players
Ettan Fotboll players
Ghanaian expatriate footballers
Expatriate footballers in Sweden
Expatriate soccer players in the United States
Ghanaian expatriate sportspeople in Sweden
International Allies F.C. players
USL Championship players